Pavement is a street in the city centre of York, in England.

History
The area occupied by Pavement was outside the Roman city walls, but fairly central within the Mediaeval walls of York.  During the Anglo-Saxon and Viking eras, it was at the heart of the commercial area of Jorvik.  The location of one of York's two early markets, the road was known as Marketshire, a name first recorded in 1086, and shared with the city ward in which it was located.  It was alternatively known as Ousegate, which remains the name of its western continuation.  By the Middle Ages, its market days were Tuesday, Thursday and Saturday, and the central part of the street was roughly its present width - far wider than most city streets of the time.

From 1329, the street was increasingly known as "Pavement", which is likely to indicate that it was one of the first roads in the city to be paved.  As a major open space in the city, it was popular site for public gatherings, it contained a ring for bull baiting, and was also the location where Thomas Percy, 7th Earl of Northumberland was executed.

The market continued to thrive, and a market cross was erected in 1671.  By the 18th-century, the market was short of space, and sections of the road were widened: shops in front of St Crux were demolished in 1769, followed by the chancel and part of the churchyard of All Saints, in 1782.  The market cross was demolished in 1813.  In 1836, Parliament Street was laid out, leading to the demolition of many buildings on the north side of the street, St Crux was demolished in 1887, and then in 1912, Piccadilly was extended to reach Pavement on the south side, resulting in more demolitions.  Finally, in the 1950s, Stonebow was constructed as an eastern continuation of the street.

Layout and architecture
At the western end of the street, Parliament Street runs to the north and Piccadilly to the south, while to the west it splits into High Ousegate and Coppergate.  Between those last two streets lies the church of All Saints, Pavement.  Several historic buildings lie on the southern side of the street.  Sir Thomas Herbert's House, at number 12, is the sole survivor of the large merchants' houses which once lined the street, but the 4, 6, and 10 Pavement, the Golden Fleece pub, 18, 20 and 22 Pavement, 24 Pavement, 26 and 28 Pavement, and 30 Pavement, are all listed buildings.

At the eastern end of the street, Stonebow continues to the east, Fossgate runs south, and Whip-Ma-Whop-Ma-Gate runs north.  The only historic building surviving on the north side is the parish room of St Crux Church, with the modern Marks and Spencer store dominating.

The Shambles lead north off Pavement, while the small Lady Peckett's Yard leads off its southern side.

References

Further reading

Streets in York